Tirukkazhippalai Palvannanathar Temple is a Hindu temple located at Sivapuri in Cuddalore district of Tamil Nadu, India.  The presiding deity is Shiva in the form of Palvannanathar and his consort is known as Vedanayaki. The presiding deity is revered in the 7th century Tamil Saiva canonical work, the Tevaram, written by Tamil saint poets known as the nayanmars and classified as Paadal Petra Sthalam.

The temple complex covers an area of one acre and all its shrines are enclosed with concentric rectangular walls. The temple has a number of shrines, with those of Oondreswarar and his consort Minnoli Amman being the most prominent. The temple has three daily rituals at various times from 6:00 a.m. to 8:30 p.m., and four yearly festivals on its calendar. Brahmotsavam festival during the Tamil month of Vaikasi (May - June) is the most prominent festival celebrated in the temple. The temple is also called Bhairava Temple and sports an image of Bhairava similar to the one in Varanasi.

Legend 
As per Hindu legend, the god Shiva and his wife Parvati appeared before the sage Agastya at this place. It is counted as one of the eight places where the sage got the darshan of Shiva. As per another legend, sage Kabila made a lingam (an iconic representation of Shiva). A king was moving along the way and his horse's hooves split the lingam into two. The sage was disappointed and he started making another lingam. Shiva and Parvati made a divine intervention and provided milk from the divine cow Kamadhenu that strengthened the image. The deity thus came to be known as Palvannanathar. In modern times, it is believed that the ablution done with milk is absorbed by the image. The temple is believed to have been in a place called Karaimedu village which was washed away in a flood in river Coleroon and has been moved here.

Architecture

Palvannanathar temple is located in Sivapuri, a place  from Chidambaram. The temple has a three tiered rajagopuram on the eastern side with concentric rectangular walls surrounding the temple. The passageway from the main road to the gopuram has an image of Nandi, located axial to the sanctum. The sanctum is approached through a pillared hall called mukha mandapa and an artha mandapa. The shrine of the Ambal is located in the mukhamandapa facing south. The presiding deity in the form of lingam (an iconic form of Shiva) is located in the sanctum. It is believed that the image is self manifested. There is a panel on the wall behind the image that depicts the marriage of Shiva and Parvathi. There is a circumabulatory passage around the shrines. The pillars in the hall leading to the sanctum has sculpted images depicting various Hindu legends. There is an image of Bhairava located in the south eastern corner of the temple, which is believed to have been made by same sculptor as in Varanasi. The image does not have the vahana of Bhairava, as in other temples.

Religious importance and festivals

Sambandar, an 8th-century Tamil Saivite saint poet, venerated Uchinathar in ten verses in Tevaram, compiled as the First Tirumurai. As the temple is revered in Tevaram, it is classified as Paadal Petra Sthalam, one of the 276 temples that find mention in the Saiva canon. The temple is counted as the fourth in the series of the temples on the northern bank of river Cauvery. The temple is also called Bhairava temple. It is believed to the place where sage Agasthya and Valmiki are believed to have obtained grace. The image of Sivakami Amman is sported with her friends Vijaya and Saraswati.

The temple priests perform the puja (rituals) during festivals and on a daily basis. The temple rituals are performed three times a day; Kalasanthi at 8:00 a.m., Uchikalam at 12:00 a.m. and Sayarakshai at 6:00 p.m. Each ritual comprises four steps: abhisheka (sacred bath), alangaram (decoration), naivethanam (food offering) and deepa aradanai (waving of lamps) for Uchinathar and Uchinayagi. Thai Poosam during the Tamil month of Thai (January - February) is the most important festival of the temple. Navratri during Purattasi, Annabishekam during Aipasi, Thiruvadirai during Margazhi and Karthikai  are other festivals celebrated in the temple.

Literary mention 
Tirugnanasambandar and Appar mention the temple deity in their works.

References

External links 
 
 

Shiva temples in Cuddalore district
Padal Petra Stalam